Slovenia competed at the 2022 World Aquatics Championships in Budapest, Hungary from 17 June to 3 July.

Open water swimming

Slovenia qualified one female open water swimmers.

Women

Swimming

Slovenia entered five swimmers.

Men

Women

References

World Aquatics Championships
Nations at the 2022 World Aquatics Championships
2022